"Let Me Take You Dancing" is a song co-written and recorded by Canadian artist Bryan Adams. It was written by Bryan Adams and Jim Vallance and was later remixed by John Luongo. It is notable for being Adams' first solo single and his first ever release as a solo artist when he was 19.

Background
A disco influenced pop song in its original mix, the popular remixed version of the song is even more disco-oriented. It was one of the first songs that Adams and Vallance wrote together and was based on a rag-time piano riff that Vallance had written. The writing took place during February 1978 and the song was recorded at Pinewood Studios by Geoff Turner.
The song was originally released as a pop song, but was taken by his record company and remixed.

Remixes
Although the single had some minor radio success, respected remixer John Luongo was recruited to make it sound like a proper disco track ready for release in the United States. The song went to number 22 on the disco chart.
In 1978 Prism recorded "Don’t Turn Me Away" as a demo for the See Forever Eyes album, however it never made it to the final release.

Adams' disavowing
Luongo chose to increase the tempo of the song, but there was no time-compression technology at that time so this increased the pitch of Adams' vocals. Adams was disappointed with the sped-up sound, making him sound like a woman, according to many listeners. Adams has only performed it live on a handful of occasions. Despite being a single, neither "Let Me Take You Dancing" (except for the 12" disco mix) or its B Side, "Don't Turn Me Away", has appeared on an official CD release as of 2014, nor has been available for purchase online.

As of 2016, Web Sheriff, which Bryan Adams is a client of, actively blocks any attempts to upload this song digitally, especially on YouTube.

Releases
The song was first released in Canada in 1978:
 7" (promo) with the original version on both sides. (Cat # DJ-AM468)
 7" (retail) with "Don't Turn Me Away" as the B-side track. (Cat # AM-474)

Later was released in 1979 elsewhere:
 12" (retail): Contains John Luongo's disco mix on A side and an instrumental of the mix on B side. Cat # SP-12014.
 12" (Dutch retail): identical to above except front cover labeled "Disco Version". Cat # AMS12.7610
 7" (UK promo): Contains original version on A side and "Don't Turn Me Away" on B side. Cat # AMS7460
 7" (Mexican Promo): Contains original version on the A side and the John Luongo disco mix on the B side. Cat # AM-097Z
 7" (US promo): Contains original Stereo version on A side. B side track is Mono. Cat # 2163
 7" (European retail): Contains "Don't Turn Me Away" on B side. Cat # unknown

Availability
As of 2014, the only method to acquire "Let Me Take You Dancing" or "Don't Turn Me Away" is by purchasing the original record.

The John Luongo 12" remix of "Let Me Take You Dancing", was released on CD in 2002 as part of compilation album Disco Box Vol 2: Disco Heat.

The extended version (6:15) of "Let Me Take You Dancing" is available on the 1994 Hot Classics 12 CD.

A shortened version (3:04) of "Let Me Take You Dancing" is available on the 1993 continuous mix CD, The Dance Classic Showcase Volume 1 (mixed by D.J. John Daru).

As of 2016, the only method to acquire the instrumental version of "Let Me Take You Dancing" is by purchasing the record of the John Luongo 12" remix, which is the "B" side of said record.

Co-writer Jim Vallance stated that "I don't doubt the single's success contributed to Bryan eventually being signed directly to the label [A&M Records]".

Personnel

Original single:
Bryan Adams: lead vocal, harmony
Jim Vallance: drums, bass, keyboards
Wayne Kozak: tenor sax, baritone sax
Don Clark: trumpet
Joani Taylor: backing vocals
Rosalyn Keene: backing vocals
Nancy Nash (possibly): backing vocals
Mary Saxton (possibly): backing vocals

Added during Luongo Remix session:
Jim Vallance: percussion, vibraphone
Ray Ayotte: congas

References

Songs about dancing
Bryan Adams songs
1978 debut singles
Songs written by Jim Vallance
Songs written by Bryan Adams
Disco songs
A&M Records singles
1978 songs